Zenobia was a merchant ship launched in 1815 at Calcutta, India. She traded with India under license from the British East India Company (EIC), and made one voyage for the EIC. She then became a Free Trader (i.e., no longer required a license). In 1852 the P&O company purchased Zenobia to use her as a coal hulk. She was broken up in 1871.

Career
Zenobia first appears in Lloyd's Register in 1816 as a one-year old ship. G. Pelly is her master and owner, and her trade is London—India.

On 25 August 1827 Zenobia sailed for Bengal.

Between 9 July 1829 and 14 June 1830, Zenobia  made a return voyage from London to Bengal for the EIC. Lloyd's Register for 1830 shows Zenobia with Douglas as master & owner, and trade London—India.

The Indian businessman and industrialist Dwarkanath Tagore purchased Zenobia (or more likely a share in her), in 1833 for Rupees 55,000 from the estate of James Calder after the failure of the firm  Mackingtosh & Co.

In August 1835 Zenobia was sold to J. Owen & Co.
The following advertisement soliciting outbound passengers from England appeared in "The Indian Mail" in 1843:
For CALCUTTA, calling at MADRAS, to land Passengers only, the Teak Ship ZENOBIA, 600 Tons, S.H. Owen, Commander. To leave the St. Catherine Docks the 15th December, calling at Portsmouth to embark Passengers. — For Freight or Passage, apply to Messrs. BARING, BROTHERS, and Co., S. Bishopsgate Street; or to JAMES BARBER and Co., 17, St. Mary Ave.

In 1852 the Peninsular & Oriental Steam Navigation Co. (P&0) purchased Zenobia to use her as a hulk. Zenobia is last listed in Lloyd's Register (1852) with Saxon, owner and master, and no trade.

Fate
In 1871 Zenobia was sold for breaking up.

See also
Dwarkanath Tagore

Citations and references
Citations

References
 
 
 
 

1815 ships
Merchant ships of the United Kingdom
Ships of the British East India Company
Individual sailing vessels
British ships built in India
Coal hulks